Polymeria is a genus of plants in the tribe Convolvuleae in the family Convolvulaceae. Plants of this genus typically bear at least somewhat elongated leaves with bases of an at least subtly sagittate shape. Other generic typicalities include a pink-mauve corolla with a white-and-yellow center, and a stigma divided into multiple – sometimes more than ten – parts.

Species

Polymeria ambigua 
Polymeria angusta 
Polymeria calycina 
Polymeria distigma 
Polymeria lanata 
Polymeria longifolia 
Polymeria marginata 
Polymeria mollis 
Polymeria pusilla 
Polymeria quadrivalvis 
Polymeria subhirsuta

References

Convolvulaceae
Convolvulaceae genera